Arindrajit (Arin) Dube is a professor of economics at the University of Massachusetts Amherst, known internationally for his empirical research on the effects of minimum wage policies. He is among the foremost scholars regarding the economic impact of minimum wages. In 2019, he was asked by the UK Treasury to conduct a review of the evidence on the impact of minimum wages, which informed the decision to set the level of the National Living Wage. His work is focused on the economics of the labor market, including the role of imperfect competition, institutions, norms, and behavioral factors that affect wage setting and jobs.

Biography 
Dube graduated from Roosevelt High School in Seattle in 1991. He received his BA in economics (with honors) and MA in international development policy from Stanford University in 1996.  He received his PhD in economics from the University of Chicago in 2003, and was a postdoctorate scholar at UC Berkeley prior to joining University of Massachusetts, Amherst. He is also a research associate at the National Bureau of Economic Research. He is the brother of economist Oeindrila Dube.

Research 
Dube has published dozens of works in labor economics, health economics, public finance, and political economy. He is one of the leading scholars of minimum wage effects on employment and inequality, and has also studied the role of fairness concerns in wage-setting, the nature and extent of competition in labor markets, and the role of firm wage policies in explaining inequality growth, and impact of unions in the labor market.  He has testified on the Minimum Wage before the U.S. Senate Committee on Health, Education, Labor & Pensions, and written about this subject in the New York Times. He has studied employment patterns in all border counties in the U.S. that were affected by state-level minimum wages on one side of state border but not the other side. Dube's other research includes the impact of outsourcing in service occupations on wages and inequality. His research on imperfect competition (monopsony) in the labor market includes experimental evidence from online labor markets. He has also written on how the 2004 expiration of the Federal Assault Weapons Ban in the United States led to a surge in violence in Mexico, and how top-secret coup authorizations by the CIA were capitalized into asset prices of highly exposed American corporations.

Selected works 

 Dube, Arindrajit, T. William Lester, and Michael Reich 2010. "Minimum wage effects across state borders: Estimates using contiguous counties," The Review of Economics and Statistics 92 (4), 945-964
 Allegretto, Sylvia, Arindrajit Dube, and Michael Reich 2011. "Do minimum wages really reduce teen employment? Accounting for heterogeneity and selectivity in state panel data" Industrial Relations: A Journal of Economy and Society 50 (2), 205-240
Dube, Arindrajit, Ethan Kaplan, and Suresh Naidu 2011. "Coups, Corporations, and Classified Information." Quarterly Journal of Economics 126 (3), 1375–1409.
García-Ponce, Omar; Dube, Oeindrila; Dube, Arindrajit 2013. "Cross-Border Spillover: U.S. Gun Laws and Violence in Mexico". American Political Science Review. 107 (3): 397–417.
 Dube, Arindrajit, T. William Lester, and Michael Reich 2016. "Minimum wage shocks, employment flows and labor market frictions," Journal of Labor Economics 34 (3), 663–704
 Cengiz, Doruk, Arindrajit Dube, Attila Lindner and Ben Zipperer 2019. “The Effect of Minimum Wages on Low Wage Jobs.” Quarterly Journal of Economics 134 (3), 1405–1454
 Dube, Arindrajit, Laura Giuliano and Jonathan Leonard 2019. “Fairness and Frictions: Impact of Unequal Raises on Quit Behavior.” American Economic Review 109 (2), 620-663.
Dube, Arindrajit, Jeff Jacobs, Suresh Naidu, Siddharth Suri. "Monopsony in Online Labor Markets" American Economic Review: Insights.

References 

21st-century American economists
Labor economists
Living people
Stanford University alumni
University of Chicago alumni
University of Massachusetts Amherst faculty
Year of birth missing (living people)